There are several stadiums in Vladimir city:

 Torpedo stadium - largest Vladimir football stadium;
 Lybed' - other stadium, in summer used for football, in winter - for skating.